Contemporary Museum may refer to:

Contemporary Museum Baltimore
Honolulu Museum of Art Spalding House (formerly The Contemporary Museum, Honolulu)